Mathieu De Smet (born 27 April 2000) is a Belgian professional footballer who plays as a midfielder for Dutch club HSV Hoek.

Career

Zulte Waregem
De Smet joined Zulte Waregem in the summer 2016 from K.A.A. Gent. He signed his first professional contract with the club on 1 March 2019 and was permanently promoted into the first team squad. On 31 January 2020, De Smet moved to K.M.S.K. Deinze on loan for the rest of the season. On 31 August 2020, De Smet moved on loan to TOP Oss for the 2021–22 season. On 3 January 2022, the loan was terminated early.

References

External links

2000 births
Living people
Belgian footballers
Belgian expatriate footballers
Association football midfielders
Club Brugge KV players
K.A.A. Gent players
S.V. Zulte Waregem players
K.M.S.K. Deinze players
TOP Oss players
HSV Hoek players
Belgian Pro League players
Belgian Third Division players
Eerste Divisie players
Expatriate footballers in the Netherlands
Belgian expatriate sportspeople in the Netherlands
Sportspeople from Namur (city)
Footballers from Namur (province)